Klitten is a railway station near the village of Klitten, Boxberg municipality, Saxony, Germany. The station lies on the Węgliniec–Roßlau railway, train services are operated by Ostdeutsche Eisenbahn.

Train services
The station is served by the following services:

regional service  Hoyerswerda - Görlitz

Train services are currently not operating between Hoyerswerda and Klitten. These services are replaced by buses.

References

External links
 
Deutsche Bahn website 
Ostdeutsche Eisenbahn website

Railway stations in Saxony
Boxberg, Saxony